The Silverton Tramway 48s class are a class of diesel locomotives built by AE Goodwin, Auburn for the Silverton Tramway in 1960–1961. The State Rail Authority 48 class and South Australian Railways 830 class are of a very similar design.

History
Between December 1960 and September 1961, the Silverton Tramway Company took delivery of three Alco DL531 locomotives from AE Goodwin, Auburn painted red and white numbered 27 to 29. They were the same as the 48 class and 830 class locomotives. All were delivered for use on the 56 kilometre Silverton Tramway narrow gauge line from Broken Hill to Cockburn.

After the Silverton Tramway was replaced by a new standard gauge line, 27 was sold to the South Australian Railways in February 1970 as 874 and after being rebuilt with a nose low cab, continues in service  with Genesee & Wyoming Australia as 907. The other two were fitted with standard gauge bogies, 28 at Silverton's workshop and 29 at Islington Railway Workshops and were relegated to trip working between the various mines in Broken Hill being repainted in Silverton's yellow and blue livery in May 1984.

Second hand purchases
In 1990, Silverton Rail purchased two ex Australian National 830 class from AN Tasrail followed in December 1994 by six ex State Rail Authority 48 class locomotives. Initially numbered in the STxx series, all were renumbered as the 48s class. Also purchased for parts were two 830s and three 48s.

Mainline service
In 1995/96, Silverton Rail leased ST30 to ST35 to National Rail for use on Adelaide to Melbourne services as bankers to Tailem Bend. Following Silverton Rail being awarded a contract by National Rail to haul iron ore trains from Cobar to Narromine, most of the STs were transferred to Parkes in August 1999.

All ten were included in the sale of Silverton Rail to South Spur Rail Services in 2006 and later passed to Greentrains. They primarily operate in New South Wales. In April 2016, five Greentrains units were sold to Southern Shorthaul Railroad.

Status table

Purchased new

Purchased second hand

References

A. E. Goodwin locomotives
Co-Co locomotives
Diesel locomotives of New South Wales
Railway locomotives introduced in 1960
Silverton Tramway
Standard gauge locomotives of Australia
3 ft 6 in gauge locomotives of Australia
Diesel-electric locomotives of Australia